Borthwnog is a family name given to the Borthwnog estate in Gwynedd, north-west Wales.

Borthwnog Hall was the Manor House of the estate which encompassed the adjacent Borth farm and lands up the Taichynhaeaf valley and Bontddu. The earliest records date the house to the late 17th century. The building, has been modified to a Georgian style and has, along with many other buildings in the area, been listed as a grade II listed building.

External links 

Buildings and structures in Gwynedd
Llanelltyd